Tylodicoceras is a genus of the Koninckioceratidae (Cephalopoda, Nautiloid) from the Devonian thru Mississippian of North America with a large, slightly involute, discoidal shell that is rounded laterally and concave ventrally.  Their sides bear a single row with large rounded nodes.

References 

 Bernhard Kummerl. 1964,  Nautiloidea-Nautilida. Treatise on Invertebrate Paleontology Part K. Geological Society of America and University of Kansas Press.

Prehistoric nautiloid genera